Auzoyah Alufohai (born October 16, 1996) is an American football nose tackle who is a free agent. After playing college football for the West Georgia Wolves, he signed with the Houston Texans as an undrafted free agent in 2020.

Professional career

Houston Texans
Alufohai signed with the Houston Texans as an undrafted free agent following the 2020 NFL Draft on April 27, 2020. He was waived during final roster cuts on September 5, 2020, and signed to the team's practice squad two days later. He was elevated to the active roster on December 19 for the team's week 15 game against the Indianapolis Colts, and reverted to the practice squad after the game. He was promoted to the active roster on December 23, 2020.

On August 24, 2021, Alufohai was waived by the Texans.

Chicago Bears
On September 1, 2021, Alufohai was signed to the Chicago Bears practice squad. He was released on September 8, 2021.

Green Bay Packers
On November 3, 2021, Alufohai was signed to the Green Bay Packers practice squad. He was released on November 16, 2021.

Chicago Bears (second stint)
On December 16, 2021, Alufohai was signed to the Chicago Bears practice squad. He signed a reserve/future contract with the Bears on January 11, 2022. He was waived on August 5, 2022.

Jacksonville Jaguars
On August 10, 2022, Alufohai signed with the Jacksonville Jaguars. He was waived on August 29, 2022.

References

External links
Houston Texans bio
West Georgia Wolves football bio

1996 births
Living people
Players of American football from Houston
American football defensive tackles
Kennesaw State Owls football players
West Georgia Wolves football players
Houston Texans players
Chicago Bears players
Green Bay Packers players
Jacksonville Jaguars players